Se og Hør ("See and Hear") is a TV guide and celebrity journalism magazine published in three independent versions in Denmark, Norway and Sweden (where it is called Se & Hör ) by the Danish company Aller Media. The Danish version is the oldest. The Danish and Swedish editions are published weekly, the Norwegian, the largest of the three, twice a week. It is the largest circulation illustrated weekly in all three countries; the Norwegian version has sometimes had the largest weekly circulation in Scandinavia.

Denmark
Se og Hør first appeared in Denmark in 1939 as Det Ny Radioblad (The New Radio Magazine). In 1953 it began to cover the then new medium of television and changed its name to Se og Hør, retaining the old name as a subtitle.

Se og Hør is the largest illustrated weekly in Denmark, with average weekly sales of 133,325 in the first half of 2012. In the 1980s and early 1990s, under former editor-in-chief Mogens E. Pedersen, it sold as many as 350,000 copies a week. Since November 2006, the magazine has awarded a journalism prize worth 150,000 kroner.

In June 2009, Kim Henningsen became editor-in-chief at the Danish Se og Hør, succeeding Henrik Qvortrup, who had left in November 2008 to become political editor at TV2.

In April 2014, Se og Hør was involved in a media scandal when they were accused of using illegally leaked information about celebrities' credit card transactions and flight seat numbers.

Norway
The Norwegian Se og Hør began publication in 1978 and the first issue appeared on 21 September 1978 as an offshoot of the Allers publication Allers Familie-Journal, based on the Danish magazine. The headquarters of the magazine is in Oslo. The publisher of the magazine is Se og Hør Forlaget. Knut Haavik, the first editor-in-chief, remained in the position for 25 years until his retirement in 2004, when he was succeeded by Odd Johan Nelvik, who had assisted him since the beginning. In autumn 2008, Harald Haave was named editor-in-chief after a period as assistant editor-in-chief. Nelvik retained a consultant position at the magazine. In autumn 2012, Haave was replaced by Ellen Arnstad as the magazine's first female editor-in-chief.

Since September 2003, the Norwegian Se og Hør has been published twice a week, on Tuesdays and Fridays. On 19 May 2006, the magazine launched an online version, seoghør.no, which is now the celebrity website seher.no, run by Aller Internet. , the site had approximately 450,000 unique users per week. , it ranked 74th in Norway at the Alexa Internet statistics service. David Stenerud served as its editor until May 2012, when he left and was not replaced as part of a policy of closer coordination between the website and the print magazine. In summer 2012, the magazine became available for the iPad from the Apple App Store; this mobile service had 70,000 subscribers in 2012.

In the 1990s, the Norwegian Se og Hør had the largest circulation of any Scandinavian weekly. It was the best-selling television magazine in 2003 in Norway with a circulation of 268,000 copies. In 2004, circulation fell 4.8% while the position of a competitor, Her og Nå, became stronger. The circulation of the magazine was 145,900 copies in 2006. For 2011, the figures were 178,000 for the Tuesday edition and 109,000 for the weekend edition. , in a shrinking market, it was narrowly maintaining its position as Scandinavia's biggest weekly.

The Norwegian Se og Hør has been the subject of three books by journalists. Arild Aspøy's Kjæresten fridde på dopapir: Se og Hør og kampen om privatlivet (1995) explores issues of privacy raised by the magazine's editorial practices. Håvard Melnæs' En helt vanlig dag på jobben: Se og hør fra innsiden (2007) recounts his experiences working there as a reporter and was the basis of the 2010 film En helt vanlig dag på jobben. Arne O. Holm's Ja, vi elsker Se og Hør: hemmelighetene bak verdens største ukebladsuksess (2007) analyses the balance of celebrity stories and gossip about relatively ordinary people and the influence of the magazine's coverage.

Sweden
The Swedish Se & Hör was formed in 1994 by a merger of Hänt i Veckan (founded in 1964) and Röster i radio-TV (founded in 1932 and owned by Sveriges Radio). Its editor-in-chief is Carina Löfkvist, who succeeded Tua Lundström after the latter's death in 2009.

Finland
In Finland Aller Media publishes an entertainment and TV magazine 7 päivää (commonly called Seiska) which, according to Helsingin Sanomat, is Se og Hør'''s sister magazine.

 Iceland 
The magazine is not related to the similarly named Icelandic celebrity magazine '' (Seen and Heard). In 1997, the Scandinavian publisher sued the Icelandic publisher for imitation and copyright infringement and for imitating their layout and content.

See also
List of Norwegian magazines

References

External links

1939 establishments in Denmark
1978 establishments in Norway
Se and Hor
Celebrity magazines
Magazines established in 1939
Magazines established in 1978
Se and Hor
Magazines published in Oslo
Magazines published in Sweden
Television magazines
Weekly magazines published in Denmark